Gottfried Emanuel Noether (7 January 1915 – 22 August 1991) was a German-born American statistician and educator; one of the third generation of a famous family of mathematicians: he was the son of Fritz Noether and nephew of Emmy Noether, the grandson of Max Noether, and brother of chemist Herman Noether. He died in Willimantic, Connecticut.

Education and career
Noether was born into a Jewish family in Karlsruhe, Grand Duchy of Baden, German Empire in 1915. He later moved to Breslau (now Wrocław, Poland). The Nazi regime annulled his citizenship. He immigrated to the United States in 1939, where he earned a bachelor's degree (1940) and a master's degree (1941).

The following four years, during World War II, he served with US Army intelligence in England, France, and Germany. Noether was one of the Ritchie Boys. After the war, he earned a doctorate from Columbia University (1949).

He worked in academia for the rest of his career, beginning at New York University. He moved to Boston University in 1952 where he worked until he joined the faculty of the University of Connecticut in 1968.  There, he eventually became chairman of the department of statistics. He retired in 1985.

Statistician
Noether served on a statistical advisory committee for the United States Office of Management and Budget and as an associate editor of The American Statistician. He was a fellow of the American Statistical Association and the Institute of Mathematical Statistics.

As an expert on non-parametric statistics, he wrote over 50 articles and six books. He also wrote a brief biography of his father Fritz, who was executed in the Soviet Union in 1941.

Honors
In 1999, the Gottfried E. Noether Awards were established to "recognize distinguished researchers and teachers and to support research in the field of nonparametric statistics." The initial recipients of the Gottfried E. Noether Senior Scholar Awards were Erich Leo Lehmann (2000), Robert V. Hogg (2001), and Pranab K. Sen (2002).

References

 (obituary)
 (obituary)

External links
About the Gottfried E. Noether Awards, with photograph

1915 births
1991 deaths
Columbia University alumni
Jewish American military personnel
American statisticians
20th-century American educators
University of Connecticut faculty
Boston University faculty
New York University faculty
United States Army personnel of World War II
Ritchie Boys
Jewish emigrants from Nazi Germany to the United States
Scientists from Karlsruhe
Fellows of the American Statistical Association
20th-century American mathematicians
20th-century American Jews